The Semipalatinsk Test Site (Russian: Семипалатинск-21; Semipalatinsk-21), also known as "The Polygon", was the primary testing venue for the Soviet Union's nuclear weapons. It is located on the steppe in northeast Kazakhstan (in the former Kazakh SSR), south of the valley of the Irtysh River.

The former Soviet Union conducted 456 nuclear tests at Semipalatinsk from 1949 until 1989 with little regard for their effect on the local people or environment. The full impact of radiation exposure was hidden for many years by Soviet authorities and has only come to light since the test site closed in 1991. According to estimates from Kazakh experts, 1.5 million people were exposed to fallout over the years.

From 1996 to 2012, a secret joint operation of Kazakh, Russian, and American nuclear scientists and engineers secured the waste plutonium in the tunnels of the mountains.

Since its official closure on 29 August 1991, the Semipalatinsk Test Site has become the best-researched nuclear testing site in the world, and the only one in the world open to the public year-round.

History

The site was selected in 1947 by Lavrentiy Beria, political head of the Soviet atomic bomb project (Beria falsely claimed the vast 18,000 km² steppe was "uninhabited"). Gulag labour was employed to build the primitive test facilities, including the laboratory complex in the northeast corner on the southern bank of the Irtysh River. The first Soviet bomb test, Operation First Lightning (nicknamed Joe One by the Americans) was conducted in 1949 from a tower at the Semipalatinsk Test Site, scattering fallout on nearby villages (which Beria had neglected to evacuate).

Later tests were moved to the Chagan River complex and nearby Balapan in the east of the STS (including the site of the Chagan test, which formed Chagan Lake). Once atmospheric tests were banned, testing was transferred to underground locations at Chagan, Murzhik (in the west), and at the Degelen mountain complex in the south, which is riddled with boreholes and drifts for both subcritical and supercritical tests. After the closure of the Semipalatinsk labour camp, construction duties were performed by the 217th Separate Engineering and Mining Battalion (who later built the Baikonur Cosmodrome). Between 1949 and the cessation of atomic testing in 1989, 456 explosions were conducted at the STS, including 340 underground (borehole and tunnel) shots and 116 atmospheric (either air-drop or tower shots). The lab complex, still the administrative and scientific centre of the STS, was renamed Kurchatov City after Igor Kurchatov, leader of the initial Soviet nuclear programme. The location of Kurchatov city has been typically shown on various
maps as "Konechnaya" (the name of the train station; now Degelen) or "Moldary" (the name of the village that was later incorporated into the city).

The Semipalatinsk Complex was of acute interest to foreign governments during its operation, particularly during the phase when explosions were carried out above ground at the experimental field. Several U-2 overflights examined preparations and weapons effects, before being replaced with satellite reconnaissance. The US Defense Intelligence Agency is said to have been convinced that the Soviets had constructed an enormous beam weapon station at a small research station located on the testing site.  This smaller research station, known to the Department of Defense as PNUTS (Possible Nuclear Underground Test Site) and the CIA as URDF-3 (Unidentified Research and Development Facility-3) was of great interest to American observers. After the fall of the Soviet Union in 1991, it was discovered that the mysterious URDF-3 was tasked with researching a nuclear thermal rocket similar to the US's NERVA.

The site was officially closed by the President of the Kazakh Soviet Socialist Republic Nursultan Nazarbayev on 29 August 1991.

Legacy

The Soviet Union conducted its last tests in 1989. After the Soviet Union collapsed in 1991, the site was neglected. Fissile material was left behind in mountain tunnels and bore holes, virtually unguarded and vulnerable to scavengers, rogue states, or potential terrorists. The secret cleanup of Semipalatinsk was made public in the 2010s.

After some of the tests, radioactive material remained on the now abandoned area, including significant amounts of plutonium. The risk that material might fall into the hands of scavengers or terrorists was considered one of the largest nuclear security threats since the collapse of the Soviet Union. The operation to address the problem involved, in part, pouring special concrete into test holes, to bind the waste plutonium. In other cases, horizontal mine test holes were sealed and the entrances covered over. Finally in October 2012, Kazakh, Russian, and American nuclear scientists and engineers celebrated the completion of a secret 17-year, $150 million operation to secure the plutonium in the tunnels of the mountains.

Large parts of the STS have opened up since 2014, and economic activity has resumed: mostly mining, but also agriculture and tourism. As with other areas affected by radioactivity, the lack of human interference has made the STS a haven for wildlife.

The people within Koyan, Kazakhstan have been affected by the radiation and have suffered from radiation caused illnesses just as other surrounding areas have. However, unlike other communities, some citizens of Koyan have formed an identity around this fact. Some have even considered themselves to be a new breed of human, a step-up evolution. As they understand it, they are mutants who have grown and adapted to the radiation present in their home. In their eyes, the air and food are poisonous, and the people consume this and yet live. Thus, they must be adapting to the radiation and that is why people only get a 'little sick'. They even have begun to believe that they are so used to radiation that their bodies require it. This belief has stemmed from the fact that many individuals who moved away from the city died within two years. As such, to some left behind, it seems that the lack of radiation killed them. This has further cemented their belief that they are 'radioactive mutants'.

The locals also believe that their status is backed by science. The basis of this was a training exercise performed by the Comprehensive Test-Ban-Treaty Organization (CTBTO). The exercise was based around a hypothetical nuclear explosion, so they came in wearing full protective gear. The citizens of Koyan witnessed this but were not informed of the 'exercise' status nor the reason for the outsiders' presence. As such the citizens perceived strangers having to wear protective gear to enter the area around their community while they, the residents, had no need. This further cemented their belief that they must be radioactive mutants as other people seemed to need protection to exist within their home.

Anti-nuclear movement
The anti-nuclear movement in Kazakhstan, "Nevada Semipalatinsk", was formed in 1989 and was one of the first major anti-nuclear movements in the former Soviet Union.  It was led by author Olzhas Suleimenov and attracted thousands of people to its protests and campaigns which eventually led to the closure of the nuclear test site at Semipalatinsk in 1991.

According to UNESCO, Nevada-Semipalatinsk played a positive role in promoting public understanding of "the necessity to fight against nuclear threats". The movement gained global support and became "a real historical factor in finding solutions to global ecological problems".

Health impacts

Studies conducted at Cambridge took blood samples from forty different families who lived in a district of Kazakhstan that were directly exposed at high levels to fallout from the Soviet bomb tests. These studies concluded that individuals who had been exposed to the fallout between 1949 and 1956 had an approximate 80% increase of mutations in the Minisatellite regions of their DNA. The children of these individuals had 50% more mutations in their mini-satellite regions compared to their control counterparts. Some health scientists are still not sure what the germline mutations mean for the individuals' health, but there is increasing evidence these mutations may increase genetic predisposition to certain diseases such as cardiovascular diseases.  There has also been evidence that increased levels of DNA mutation rates are correlated with prolonged 
radiation exposure. A longitudinal study conducted over a 40-year span found a correlation between radiation fallout exposure and prevalence of solid tumors. The most frequent sites for solid tumors were the esophagus, stomach, lungs, breasts, and liver. These sites were found to have statistically significant increases in prevalence when compared to a control group. However some bodily sites had no significant difference in number: cervix uteri, kidney, rectum, and pancreas. The study's data suggests that there is a link between exposure length, and amount, to overall and cancer mortality. Nonetheless the relationship between the level of radiation exposure and effect is still up for discussion.

The full impact of radiation exposure was hidden for many years by Soviet authorities. The general consensus of health studies conducted at the site since it was closed is that radioactive fallout from nuclear testing had a direct impact on the health of about 200,000 local residents. Specifically, scientists have linked higher rates of different types of cancer to post-irradiation effects.  Likewise, several studies have explored the correlation between radiation exposure and thyroid abnormalities.
A BBC program claimed in 2010 that in the worst affected locations one in twenty children born were with genetic defects. British film-maker Antony Butts documented some of the genetic health impacts in his 2010 film After the Apocalypse.

A recently declassified CIA report provides a first-hand witness account of the immediate impacts of a nuclear test near Semipalatinsk in 1955. In this report, a source who was in the vicinity of a Soviet thermonuclear test in November 1955 describes experiencing loss of hearing, "the air...crackling up with pressure" as if the "air was tearing up," and the ground shaking.

Ethnographic data from anthropological study detail some of the unique perspectives of those populations that are affected and still live within the area of radiation exposure that allow those populations to understand their circumstances and the biological subjectivity of concepts like safety and their survival within an area still affected by radiation.

Site of the signing of the Central Asian Nuclear Weapon Free Zone treaty
Semipalatinsk was the site that Kazakhstan, Kyrgyzstan, Tajikistan, Turkmenistan, and Uzbekistan chose for the signing of the Central Asian Nuclear Weapon Free Zone on 8 September 2006, also commemorating the 15th anniversary of the test site's closing.

In popular culture
The 2014 film Ispytanie is a fictionalized account of the first Soviet nuclear test from the perspective of some of the local inhabitants.

See also

Anti-nuclear movement in Kazakhstan
List of nuclear reactors
List of nuclear tests
List of nuclear weapons tests of the Soviet Union
Lists of nuclear disasters and radioactive incidents
Nevada Test Site
Novaya Zemlya Test Site
Nuclear energy in Kazakhstan
Operation Plumbbob
Struan Stevenson
Totskoye nuclear exercise
Ulba Metallurgical Plant
Aral Sea disaster

References

External links

National Nuclear Center of Kazakhstan website
The Nuclear Threat Initiative's page on the STS
nuclearweaponarchive.org/ on the Soviet nuclear program
Documentary about the tests and their effects on the populace
Short documentary series "My home: nuclear base Semipalatinsk-21"
Panoramic photos and videos of the test site

Nuclear test sites in Kazakhstan
Nuclear weapons program of the Soviet Union
Kazakh Soviet Socialist Republic
Science and technology in Kazakhstan
Nuclear technology in Kazakhstan
Nuclear test sites
Environmental disasters in Asia
East Kazakhstan Region
1949 establishments in the Soviet Union
Atomic tourism